Number 601 (County of London) Squadron is a squadron of the RAF Reserves, based in London. The squadron took part in the Battle of Britain, during which the first Americans to fly in World War II were members of the squadron.

Reactivated in 2017, it is a specialist squadron "tapping into the talents of leaders from industry, academia and research to advise and shape and inspire [the RAF]".

History

Formation
No. 601 Squadron was formed at RAF Northolt on 14 October 1925 when a group of wealthy aristocratic young men, all of whom were amateur aviators, decided to form themselves into a Reserve Squadron of the RAF after a meeting in White's Club, London. The original officers were picked by the first commanding officer, Lord Edward Grosvenor, youngest son of Hugh Grosvenor, 1st Duke of Westminster. Grosvenor tested potential recruits by plying them with alcohol to see if they would behave inappropriately. Grosvenor wanted officers "of sufficient presence not to be overawed by him and of sufficient means not to be excluded from his favourite pastimes, eating, drinking and Whites". The Squadron was initially known as "the millionaires squadron", a nametag gained because of a reputation for filling their ranks with the very 'well-heeled'. Most of these affluent young pilots had little regard for the rigid discipline of the regular service; they lined their uniform tunics with bright red silk and wore blue ties rather than the regulation black. They played polo on brand-new Brough Superior motor cycles, drove fast sports cars (the squadron car park was said to resemble a Concours d'Elegance) and most of the pilots owned their own private aircraft.

Second World War
The Squadron became a day fighter unit in 1940 and operated both the Hawker Hurricane and the Supermarine Spitfire. Aircrew attrition and transfers to other units, war quickly took its toll on the pre-war personnel and as replacements were drafted in from all walks of life and all parts of the Commonwealth to cover casualties and promotions, the Squadron became as cosmopolitan as any other.

Postwar operations
The unit reformed in 1946 as a fighter squadron within the Royal Auxiliary Air Force (RAuxAF), initially equipped with the Spitfire, followed by the jet powered De Havilland Vampire and the Gloster Meteor twin-jet. The squadron disbanded along with all other RAuxAF units during the defence cuts of early 1957.

Present
Reforming on 20 April 2017 at RAF Northolt, 601 Squadron is now a Specialist Support Squadron of the RAuxAF.  The 3 principal roles of the Squadron are to provide advice to the Chief of the Air Staff and the RAF to help address important issues; to provide access to new networks that the RAF has not traditionally been connected with; and to develop advocates for the RAF.

Aircraft operated

Squadron bases

Notable pilots

 Sqn Ldr Roger Bushell – took part in the Great Escape
 Sqn Ldr Gordon "Mouse" Cleaver DFC – Battle of Britain pilot whose accident aided the development of artificial optical lenses.
 Flt Lt Carl Davis DFC – American who flew with 601 Sqn during the Battle of Britain
 Plt Off "Billy" Fiske – American who flew with 601 Sqn during the Battle of Britain
 Gp Cpt Sir Archibald Philip Hope, 17th Baronet OBE DFC
 Plt Off B P Legge DFC
 Plt Off H C Mayers DSO DFC and Bar  – Australian who flew with 601 Sqn during the Battle of Britain
 Gp Cpt J A O'Neill
 Fg Off W H Rhodes-Moorhouse DFC
 Sqn Ldr "Jack" Riddle & Sqn Ldr Hugh Riddle – brothers and last surviving aircrew who flew with 601 Sqn during the Battle of Britain (both died 2009)
 Sqn Ldr Stanisław Skalski DSO, DFC and Two Bars,- Polish ace, the second Pole to command an RAF Squadron, and later Polish Air Force general
 Flight Lieutenant Edward Whitehead Reid
 Air Cdre Whitney Straight CBE MC DFC
 Plt Off D R W Stubbs OBE DSO DFC
 Flight Lieutenant Denis Barnham (1920 - 1981).  Painter, teacher and author of 'One man's window' his autobiographical account of the Siege of Malta otherwise titled as 'Malta Spitfire Pilot - Ten weeks of terror April - June 1942.

For more pilots who flew with the Squadron during the Battle of Britain, see List of RAF aircrew in the Battle of Britain.

Commanding officers

Note: Sir Philip Sassoon was Member of Parliament during his Squadron Leadership of 601 Squadron.

See also
Engineer and Logistic Staff Corps

References

Notes

Bibliography

External links

 Squadron history on Battle of Britain website
 Squadron history on RAF website
 https://commons.m.wikimedia.org/wiki/File:Flight_Lieutenant_Dennis_Barnham_of_No._601_Squadron_RAF_in_the_cockpit_of_his_Supermarine_Spitfire_Mk_VB_at_Luqa,_Malta,_with_Pilot_Officer_M_H_Le_Bas,_June_1942._GM1001.jpg
 History of No.'s 600–604 Squadrons at RAF Web
 Squadron locations
 601 Squadron (County of London) Recreated
 

601 Squadron
No. 601
RAF squadrons involved in the Battle of Britain
Military units and formations established in 1925